The men's 30 kilometre pursuit at the FIS Nordic World Ski Championships 2013 took place on 23 February 2013.

Results 
The race was started at 14:15.

References

FIS Nordic World Ski Championships 2013